This article covers the 2010 football season in Chile.

National tournaments

Primera División

Due to the 2010 Chile earthquake, there was a single tournament, rather than the usual consecutive Apertura and  Clausura "seasons"
Champion: Universidad Católica (10th title)
Topscorer: Milovan Mirosevic (19 goals)
Relegated: Everton, San Luis Quillota
Source: RSSSF

Copa Chile

Winner: Municipal Iquique (2nd title)
Source: RSSSF

National team results

2010 World Cup

Friendly matches

References

External links
 Chile: Fixtures and Results at FIFA

 
Seasons in Chilean football